This is a list of shipwrecks located in and around the continent of Europe.

Albania

Belgium

Bulgaria

Canary Islands

Corsica

Croatia

Cyprus

Denmark

Estonia

Faroe Islands

Finland

France

Germany

Gibraltar

Greece

Greenland

Iceland

Ireland

Isle of Man

Italy

Latvia

Lithuania

Malta

Montenegro

The Netherlands

Norway

Poland

Portugal

Romania

Russia / Soviet Union

Spain

Slovenia

Sweden

Ukraine

United Kingdom

References

External links
 WRECKSITE Worldwide free database of + 65,000 wrecks with history, maritime charts and GPS positions

Europe
Shipwrecks
 
Shipwrecks